Ondřej Fadrny (born 25 September 1978) is a Czech former cyclist, who last rode for PSK Whirlpool.

Major results 
1997
 2nd Road race, National Road Championships
1998
 10th Road race, European Under-23 Road Championships
1999
 1st Stage 1 Tour de Bohême
 5th Road race, European Under-23 Road Championships
2000
 1st Memorial Guido Zamperioli
 3rd Overall Okolo Slovenska
 8th Road race, European Under-23 Road Championships
2001
 1st Medaglia d'Oro Fiera di Sommacampagna
2002
 1st  Road race, National Road Championships
2003
 2nd Road race, National Road Championships
2004
 1st Overall Tour of Małopolska
1st Stage 1
2005
 2nd Memoriał Henryka Łasaka

References 

Czech male cyclists
Living people
1978 births
Sportspeople from Brno